The Shota Rustaveli State Prize (created in 1965) is the highest prize awarded by Georgia in the fields of art and literature. The first prize-winners of this prize were Konstantine Gamsakhurdia (writer), Irakli Abashidze (poet) and Lado Gudiashvili (painter) in 1965. Other recipients of the Prize: Mikola Bazhan (Ukrainian poet), Sergo Kobuladze (painter), Irakli Ochiauri (sculptor), Sergo Zakariadze (actor), Nino Ramishvili (dancer), Iliko Sukhishvili (dancer), Ramaz Chkhikvadze (actor), Guram Pataraia (producer), Tengiz Abuladze (producer), Mukhran Machavariani (poet), Tamaz Chiladze (poet), Chabua Amirejibi (novelist), Levan Tsutskiridze (painter), etc.

References

Literary awards of Georgia (country)
Awards established in 1965